The Australian Netball Championships, formerly the Australian Netball League, is an Australian netball competition. Since 2008 it has served as a second level competition, initially below the ANZ Championship and later below Suncorp Super Netball. It is organised by Netball Australia. The teams in the competition are effectively the reserve teams of Suncorp Super Netball teams and/or the representative teams of state netball leagues, such as the South Australia state netball league, the Victorian Netball League and the West Australian Netball League. Victorian Fury were the inaugural ANL champions. Fury are also the competition's most successful team, having won eight premierships. The 2020 ANL season was cancelled due to the COVID-19 pandemic and the competition was subsequently re-branded as the Australian Netball Championships.

History

Australian Netball League

Foundation
The Australian Netball League was first played for during the 2008 season. Netball Australia wanted to organise a second level national league to bridge the gap between states leagues, like the South Australia state netball league, the Victorian Netball League and the West Australian Netball League, and the new ANZ Championship. It was also designed to provide a national competition for the states and territories of Australia, such the Australian Capital Territory, Northern Territory and Tasmania, who did not have an ANZ Championship franchise.

Victorian Fury dominance
Victorian Fury were the inaugural champions, defeating the Australian Institute of Sport 56–41 in the first grand final. In 2009 Fury retained the title   and in 2010 they completed a three in a row. In 2011 NNSW Waratahs became the first team other than Fury to win the ANL title. In the grand final they defeated Fury 55–46. Between 2013 and 2016 Fury completed a four in a row of ANL titles. In 2016 Fury won their seventh title  and in 2019 they won their eighth.

Australian Netball Championships
In June 2020, Netball Australia announced that the 2020 ANL season would be  cancelled due to the COVID-19 pandemic. In October 2020, it was announced that the ANL was to be rebranded as the Australian Netball Championships, featuring a new tournament style format with expanded team entry parameters. Suncorp Super Netball teams and Netball Australia member organisations would all be invited to enter teams. In July 2021, Netball Australia announced details of the planned inaugural ANC tournament due to be played in September and hosted by Latrobe City Council and Collingwood Magpies in Traralgon. However, in August 2021 this tournament was also cancelled due to the COVID-19 pandemic.

Teams

2022 teams
The teams in the competition are effectively the reserve teams of Suncorp Super Netball teams and/or the representative teams of state netball leagues, such as the South Australia state netball league, the Victorian Netball League and the West Australian Netball League.

Former teams

Grand Finals

Notes
   The 2020 and 2021 competitions were cancelled due to the COVID-19 pandemic in Australia.

Winners

MVP

Sponsorship

References

 
!
2008 establishments in Australia
Sports leagues established in 2008